Sauropsis (from  , 'lizard' and   'looking') is an extinct genus of prehistoric bony fish.

See also

 List of prehistoric bony fish genera

References

External links
 Bony fish in the online Sepkoski Database

Pachycormiformes
Taxa named by Louis Agassiz